The Shaw Festival is a major Canadian theatre festival in Niagara-on-the-Lake, Ontario, the second largest repertory theatre company in North America. Founded in 1962, its original mandate was to stimulate interest in George Bernard Shaw and his period, and to advance the development of theatre arts in Canada.

The following is a chronological list of the productions that have been staged as part of the Shaw Festival since its inception.

1962
Don Juan in Hell – (from Man and Superman) by George Bernard Shaw
Candida – by George Bernard Shaw

1963
You Never Can Tell – by George Bernard Shaw
How He Lied to Her Husband – by George Bernard Shaw
The Man of Destiny – by George Bernard Shaw
Androcles and the Lion – by George Bernard Shaw

1964
Heartbreak House – by George Bernard Shaw
Village Wooing – by George Bernard Shaw
The Dark Lady of the Sonnets – by George Bernard Shaw
John Bull's Other Island – by George Bernard Shaw

1965
Pygmalion – by George Bernard Shaw
The Shadow of a Gunman – by Seán O'Casey
The Millionairess – by George Bernard Shaw

1966
Man and Superman – by George Bernard Shaw
Misalliance – by George Bernard Shaw
The Apple Cart – by George Bernard Shaw

1967
Arms and the Man – by George Bernard Shaw
The Circle – by W. Somerset Maugham
Major Barbara – by George Bernard Shaw

1968
Heartbreak House – by George Bernard Shaw
The Importance of Being Oscar – based on the life and works of Oscar Wilde, by Michael MacLiammoir
The Chemmy Circle – by Georges Feydeau, translated by Suzanne Grossman

1969
The Doctor's Dilemma – by George Bernard Shaw
Back to Methuselah (Part One) – by George Bernard Shaw
Five Variations for Corno di Basetto – from the music criticism of George Bernard Shaw
The Guardsman – by Ferenc Molnár

1970
Candida – by George Bernard Shaw
Forty Years On – by Alan Bennett

1971
The Philanderer – by George Bernard Shaw
Summer Days – by Romain Weingarten, translated by Suzanne Grossman
Tonight at 8.30 – by Noël Coward
War Women and Other Trivia -- A Social Success – by Max Beerbohm
O'Flaherty V.C. – by George Bernard Shaw
Press Cuttings – by George Bernard Shaw

1972
The Royal Family – by George S. Kaufman and Edna Ferber
Getting Married – by George Bernard Shaw
Misalliance – by George Bernard Shaw

1973
You Never Can Tell – by George Bernard Shaw
The Brass Butterfly – by William Golding
Fanny's First Play – by George Bernard Shaw
Sister of Mercy - A Musical Journey into the World of Leonard Cohen – conceived by Gene Lesser

1974
The Devil's Disciple – by George Bernard Shaw
Too True to be Good – by George Bernard Shaw
Charley's Aunt – by Brandon Thomas
The Admirable Bashville – by George Bernard Shaw
Rosmersholm – by Henrik Ibsen

1975
Pygmalion – by George Bernard Shaw
Leaven of Malice – by Robertson Davies
Caesar and Cleopatra – by George Bernard Shaw
The First Night of Pygmalion – by Richard Huggett
G.K.C. The Wit and Wisdom of Gilbert Keith Chesterton – compiled, arranged and performed by Tony Van Bridge

1976
Mrs. Warren's Profession – by George Bernard Shaw
The Admirable Crichton – by J. M. Barrie
Arms and the Man – by George Bernard Shaw
The Apple Cart – by George Bernard Shaw

1977
Man and Superman – by George Bernard Shaw
Thark – by Ben Travers
The Millionairess – by George Bernard Shaw
Great Catherine – by George Bernard Shaw
Widowers' Houses – by George Bernard Shaw

1978
Major Barbara – by George Bernard Shaw
John Gabriel Borkman – by Henrik Ibsen
Heartbreak House – by George Bernard Shaw
Lady Audley's Secret – A Musical Melodrama – by Mary Elizabeth Braddon, adapted by Douglas Seale, music by George Goehring, lyrics by John Kuntz

1979
You Never Can Tell – by George Bernard Shaw
The Corn is Green – by Emlyn Williams
Dear Liar – by Jerome Kilty
Captain Brassbound's Conversion – by George Bernard Shaw
Blithe Spirit – by Noël Coward
My Astonishing Self from the writings of G.B.S., – by Michael Voysey
Village Wooing – by George Bernard Shaw

1980
Misalliance – by George Bernard Shaw
The Cherry Orchard – by Anton Chekhov
A Flea in Her Ear – by Georges Feydeau
The Grand Hunt – by Gyula Hernady
The Philanderer – by George Bernard Shaw
A Respectable Wedding – by Bertolt Brecht, translated by Jean Benedetti
Canuck – by John Bruce Cowan
Puttin on the Ritz – by Irving Berlin
Gunga Heath – compiled and performed by Heath Lamberts
Overruled – by George Bernard Shaw

1981
Saint Joan – by George Bernard Shaw
Tons of Money – by Will Evans and Valentine
The Suicide – by Nikolai Erdman
Camille – by Robert David MacDonald
In Good King Charles's Golden Days – by George Bernard Shaw
The Magistrate – by Arthur Wing Pinero
Rose-Marie – book and lyrics by Otto Harbach and Oscar Hammerstein, music by Rudolf Friml and Herbert Stothart
The Man of Destiny – by George Bernard Shaw

1982
Pygmalion – by George Bernard Shaw
See How They Run – by Philip King
Camille – by Robert David MacDonald
Cyrano de Bergerac – by Edmond Rostand
Too True to Be Good – by George Bernard Shaw
The Singular Life of Alfred Nobbs – adapted by Simone Benmussa from Albert Nobbs by George Moore
The Desert Song – book and lyrics by Otto Harbach, Oscar Hammerstein and Frank Mandel
The Music Cure – by George Bernard Shaw

1983
Caesar and Cleopatra – by George Bernard Shaw
Cyrano de Bergerac – by Edmond Rostand
Rookery Nook – by Ben Travers
Private Lives – by Noël Coward
The Simpleton of the Unexpected Isles – by George Bernard Shaw
Candida – by George Bernard Shaw
The Vortex – by Noël Coward
Tom Jones – by Sir Edward German, libretto by Robert Courtneidge and A. M. Thompson
O'Flaherty V.C. – by George Bernard Shaw

1984
The Devil's Disciple – by George Bernard Shaw
Private Lives – by Noël Coward
The Skin of Our Teeth – by Thornton Wilder
Célimar (or Friends of a Feather) – by Eugène Labiche
Androcles and the Lion – by George Bernard Shaw
The Vortex – by Noël Coward
The Lost Letter – by Ian Luca Caragiale
Roberta – books and lyrics by Otto Harbach, music by Jerome Kern
The Shaw Playlets: The Fascinating Foundling and How He Lied to Her Husband – by George Bernard Shaw
1984 – by George Orwell

1985
Heartbreak House – by George Bernard Shaw
The Madwoman of Chaillot – by Jean Giraudoux
One for the Pot – by Ray Cooney and Tony Hilton
Cavalcade – by Noël Coward
John Bull's Other Island – by George Bernard Shaw
The Women – by Clare Boothe Luce
Tropical Madness No. 2 - Metaphysics of the Two-Headed Calf – by Stanisław Witkiewicz
Murder on the Nile – by Agatha Christie
Naughty Marietta – book and lyrics by Rida Johnson Young, music by Victor Herbert
The Inca of Perusalem – by George Bernard Shaw

1986
Arms and the Man – by George Bernard Shaw
Banana Ridge – by Ben Travers
Cavalcade – by Noël Coward
Back to Methuselah – by George Bernard Shaw
On the Rocks – by George Bernard Shaw
Holiday – by Philip Barry
Tonight We Improvise – by Luigi Pirandello
Black Coffee – by Agatha Christie
Girl Crazy – music by George Gershwin, lyrics by Ira Gershwin, libretto by John McGowan and Guy Bolton
Passion, Poison and Petrifaction – by George Bernard Shaw

1987
Major Barbara – by George Bernard Shaw
Hay Fever – by Noël Coward
Marathon 33 – by June Havoc
Peter Pan – by J.M. Barrie
Fanny's First Play – by George Bernard Shaw
Night of January 16th – by Ayn Rand
Playing with Fire – by August Strindberg
Salome – by Oscar Wilde
Not in the Book – by Arthur Watkyn
Anything Goes – music and lyrics by Cole Porter, book by Guy Bolton and P.G. Wodehouse
Augustus Does His Bit – by George Bernard Shaw

1988
You Never Can Tell – by George Bernard Shaw
Peter Pan – by J.M. Barrie
War and Peace – by Leo Tolstoy
Once in a Lifetime – by Moss Hart and George S. Kaufman
Geneva – by George Bernard Shaw
The Voysey Inheritance – by Harley Granville Barker
He Who Gets Slapped – by Leonid Andreyev
Dangerous Corner – by J.B. Priestley
Hit the Deck – music by Vincent Youmans, lyrics by Leo Robin, Clifford Grey and Irving Caesar, book by Herbert Fields
The Dark Lady of the Sonnets – by George Bernard Shaw

1989
Man and Superman – by George Bernard Shaw
Berkeley Square – by John L. Balderston
Once in a Lifetime – by Moss Hart and George S. Kaufman
Trelawny of the "Wells" – by Arthur Wing Pinero
Getting Married – by George Bernard Shaw
Peer Gynt – by Henrik Ibsen, translated by John Lingard
Nymph Errant – music and lyrics by Cole Porter, libretto by Romney Brent, from the novel by James Laver
An Inspector Calls – by J.B. Priestley
Good News – music by Ray Henderson, book by Laurence Schwab and B.G. DeSylva
Shakes versus Shav and The Glimpse of Reality – by George Bernard Shaw

1990
Misalliance – by George Bernard Shaw
Trelawny of the "Wells" – by Arthur Wing Pinero
The Waltz of the Toreadors – by Jean Anouilh, translated by Lucienne Hill
Present Laughter – by Noël Coward
Mrs. Warren's Profession – by George Bernard Shaw
Nymph Errant – music and lyrics by Cole Porter, libretto by Romney Brent, from the novel by James Laver
Ubu Rex – by Alfred Jarry, translated by David Copelin
Night Must Fall – by Emlyn Williams
When We Are Married – by J.B. Priestley
Village Wooing – by George Bernard Shaw

1991
The Doctor's Dilemma – by George Bernard Shaw
A Cuckoo in the Nest – by Ben Travers
Lulu – by Frank Wedekind
The Millionairess – by George Bernard Shaw
Henry IV – by Luigi Pirandello
Hedda Gabler – by Henrik Ibsen
A Connecticut Yankee – music by Richard Rodgers, lyrics by Lorenz Hart, book by Herbert Fields
This Happy Breed – by Noël Coward
Press Cuttings – by George Bernard Shaw

1992
Pygmalion – by George Bernard Shaw
Counsellor-at-Law – by Elmer Rice
Charley's Aunt – by Brandon Thomas
Widowers' Houses – by George Bernard Shaw
Drums in the Night – by Bertolt Brecht
Point Valaine – by Noël Coward
On the Town – music by Leonard Bernstein, books and lyrics by Betty Comden and Adolph Green
Ten Minute Alibi – by Anthony Armstrong
Overruled – by George Bernard Shaw

1993
Saint Joan – by George Bernard Shaw
The Silver King – by Henry Arthur Jones
Blithe Spirit – by Noël Coward
Candida – by George Bernard Shaw
The Unmentionables – by Carl Sternheim
The Marrying of Anne Leete – by Harley Granville Barker
Gentlemen Prefer Blondes – music by Jule Styne, lyrics by Leo Robin, book by Anita Loos and Joseph Fields
And Then There Were None – by Agatha Christie
The Man of Destiny – by George Bernard Shaw

1994
Arms and the Man – by George Bernard Shaw
The Front Page – by Ben Hecht and Charles MacArthur
Sherlock Holmes – by William Gillette
Too True to Be Good – by George Bernard Shaw
Eden End – by J.B. Priestley
Ivona the Princess of Burgundia – by Witold Gombrowicz
Lady Be Good – music and lyrics by George Gershwin and Ira Gershwin, book by Guy Bolton and Fred Thompson
Busman's Honeymoon – by Dorothy L. Sayers and Muriel St Clare Byrne
Rococo – by Harley Granville Barker
Annajanska the Bolshevik Princess – by George Bernard Shaw

1995
You Never Can Tell – by George Bernard Shaw
The Petrified Forest – by Robert E. Sherwood
Cavalcade – by Noël Coward
The Philanderer – by George Bernard Shaw
An Ideal Husband – by Oscar Wilde
Waste – by Harley Granville Barker
The Voice of the Turtle – by John William Van Druten
Ladies in Retirement – by Edward Percy and Reginald Denham
The Zoo – by Arthur Sullivan and B. C. Stephenson
The Six of Calais – by George Bernard Shaw

1996
The Devil's Disciple – by George Bernard Shaw
Rashoman – by Fay Kanin and Michael Kanin
Hobson's Choice – by Harold Brighouse
An Ideal Husband – by Oscar Wilde
The Simpleton of the Unexpected Isles – by George Bernard Shaw
The Playboy of the Western World – by J.M. Synge
Marsh Hay – by Merrill Denison
Mr. Cinders – music by Vivian Ellis and Richard Myers, libretto and lyrics by Clifford Grey and Greatrex Newman
The Hollow – by Agatha Christie
Shall We Join the Ladies – by J.M. Barrie
The Conjuror – by David Ben and Patrick Watson

1997
Mrs. Warren's Profession – by George Bernard Shaw
Hobson's Choice – by Harold Brighouse
Will Any Gentleman – by Vernon Sylvaine
The Seagull – by Anton Chekhov
In Good King Charles's Golden Days – by George Bernard Shaw
The Playboy of the Western World – by J.M. Synge
The Children's Hour – by Lillian Hellman
The Secret Life – by Harley Granville Barker
The Chocolate Soldier – music by Oscar Straus, adapted and arranged by Ronald Hanmer, original book and lyrics by Rudolf Bernauer and 
The Two Mrs. Carrolls – by Martin Vale
The Conjuror: Part 2 – by David Ben and Patrick Watson
Sorry Wrong Number – by Lucille Fletcher

1998
Major Barbara – by George Bernard Shaw
You Can't Take It with You – by George S. Kaufman and Moss Hart
Lady Windermere's Fan – by Oscar Wilde
The Lady's Not for Burning – by Christopher Fry
John Bull's Other Island – by George Bernard Shaw
Joy – by John Galsworthy
A Foggy Day – music and lyrics by George Gershwin and Ira Gershwin, book by Norm Foster and John Mueller
The Shop at Sly Corner – by Edward Percy
Passion, Poison and Petrifaction – by George Bernard Shaw
Brothers in Arms – by Merrill Denison
A Story of Waterloo – by Arthur Conan Doyle

1999
Heartbreak House – by George Bernard Shaw
You Can't Take It with You – by George S. Kaufman and Moss Hart
Easy Virtue – by Noël Coward
All My Sons – by Arthur Miller
Getting Married – by George Bernard Shaw
The Madras House – by Harley Granville Barker
S.S. Tenacity – by Charles Vildrac
Uncle Vanya – by Anton Chekhov
Rebecca – by Daphne du Maurier
A Foggy Day – music and lyrics by George Gershwin and Ira Gershwin, book by Norm Foster and John Mueller
Waterloo – by Arthur Conan Doyle
Village Wooing – by George Bernard Shaw

2000
The Doctor's Dilemma – by George Bernard Shaw
Easy Virtue – by Noël Coward
Lord of the Flies – by William Golding
The Matchmaker – by Thornton Wilder
A Woman of No Importance – by Oscar Wilde
The Apple Cart – by George Bernard Shaw
A Room of One's Own – by Virginia Woolf
Six Characters in Search of an Author – by Luigi Pirandello
Time and the Conways – by J.B. Priestley
She Loves Me – book by Joe Masteroff, music by Jerry Bock, lyrics by Sheldon Harnick
Still Life – by Noël Coward

2001
The Millionairess – by George Bernard Shaw
Peter Pan – by J.M. Barrie
The Man Who Came to Dinner – by Moss Hart and George S. Kaufman
Picnic – by William Inge
Fanny's First Play – by George Bernard Shaw
Six Characters in Search of an Author – by Luigi Pirandello
The Return of the Prodigal – by St John Hankin
The Mystery of Edwin Drood – a musical by Rupert Holmes
Laura – by Vera Caspary and George Sklar
Love from a Stranger – by Frank Vosper, based on a story by Agatha Christie
Shadow Play – by Noël Coward

2002
Caesar and Cleopatra – by George Bernard Shaw
Detective Story – by Sidney Kingsley
Candida – by George Bernard Shaw
Hay Fever – by Noël Coward
The Return of the Prodigal – by St John Hankin
The House of Bernarda Alba – by Federico García Lorca
His Majesty – by Harley Granville Barker
Chaplin – by Simon Bradbury
The Old Ladies – by Rodney Ackland
Merrily We Roll Along – music and lyrics by Stephen Sondheim, book by George Furth
The Old Lady Shows Her Medals – by J.M. Barrie

2003
Misalliance – by George Bernard Shaw
Three Sisters – by Anton Chekhov
The Coronation Voyage – by Michel Marc Bouchard
The Royal Family – by George S. Kaufman
Widowers' Houses – by George Bernard Shaw
Diana of Dobson's – by Cicely Hamilton
The Plough and the Stars – by Seán O'Casey
Afterplay – by Brian Friel
On the Twentieth Century – book and lyrics by Betty Comden and Adolph Green, music by Cy Coleman
Blood Relations – by Sharon Pollock
Happy End – lyrics by Bertolt Brecht, music by Kurt Weill

2004
Pygmalion – by George Bernard Shaw
The Importance of Being Earnest – by Oscar Wilde
Three Men on a Horse – by John Cecil Holm and George Abbott
Pal Joey – music by Richard Rodgers, lyrics by Lorenz Hart, book by John O'Hara
Ah, Wilderness! – by Eugene O'Neill
Rutherford and Son – by Githa Sowerby
Waiting for the Parade – by John Murrell
The Tinker's Wedding – by J.M. Synge
Man and Superman – by George Bernard Shaw
Nothing Sacred – by George F. Walker
Harlequinade – by Terence Rattigan
Floyd Collins – music and lyrics by Adam Guettel, book by Tina Landau

2005
Major Barbara – by George Bernard Shaw
You Never Can Tell – by George Bernard Shaw
Gypsy – music by Jule Styne, lyrics by Stephen Sondheim, book by Arthur Laurents
Journey's End – by R. C. Sherriff
The Autumn Garden – by Lillian Hellman
Belle Moral – by Ann-Marie MacDonald
The Constant Wife – by Somerset Maugham
Happy End – Music by Kurt Weill, Lyrics by Bertolt Brecht
Bus Stop – by William Inge
Something on the Side – (One Act) by Georges Feydeau and Maurice Desvallieres

2006
Arms and the Man – by George Bernard Shaw
Too True to be Good – by George Bernard Shaw
High Society – music and lyrics by Cole Porter, book by Arthur Kopit
The Crucible – by Arthur Miller
The Magic Fire – by Lillian Groag
Rosmersholm – by Henrik Ibsen
Love Among the Russians – by Anton Chekhov
The Heiress – adapted from Washington Square by Henry James
The Invisible Man – by Michael O'Brien, adapted from the novel by H.G. Wells
Design for Living – by Noël Coward

2007
The Philanderer – by George Bernard Shaw
Saint Joan – by George Bernard Shaw
Mack and Mabel – music and lyrics by Jerry Herman, book by Michael Stewart
Hotel Peccadillo – by Georges Feydeau
The Circle – by Somerset Maugham
Summer and Smoke – by Tennessee Williams
A Month in the Country – by Brian Friel, based on the original by Ivan Turgenev
Tristan – by Paul Sportelli and Jay Turvey
The Cassillis Engagement – by St. John Hankin
The Kiltartan Comedies – by Lady Augusta Gregory

2008
An Inspector Calls – by J.B. Priestley
Wonderful Town – music by Leonard Bernstein, lyrics by Betty Comden, book by Joseph Fields and Jerome Chodorov
Mrs. Warren's Profession – by George Bernard Shaw
Follies: The Concert – by Stephen Sondheim
Getting Married – by George Bernard Shaw
The Little Foxes – by Lillian Hellman
After the Dance – by Terence Rattigan
The President – by Ferenc Molnár
The Stepmother – by Githa Sowerby
A Little Night Music – music and lyrics by Stephen Sondheim, book by Hugh Wheeler
Belle Moral – by Ann-Marie MacDonald

2009
Brief Encounters: Still Life, We Were Dancing and Hands Across the Sea – by Noël Coward
Play, Orchestra, Play: Red Peppers, Fumed Oak and Shadow Play – by Noël Coward
Ways of the Heart: Ways and Means, Family Album and The Astonished Heart – by Noël Coward
Star Chamber – by Noël Coward
The Entertainer – by John Osborne
The Devil's Disciple – by George Bernard Shaw
In Good King Charles's Golden Days – by George Bernard Shaw
Born Yesterday – by Garson Kanin
A Moon for the Misbegotten – by Eugene O'Neill
Albertine in Five Times – by Michel Tremblay
Sunday in the Park with George – music and lyrics by Stephen Sondheim and book by James Lapine

2010
The Women – by Clare Boothe Luce
The Doctor's Dilemma – by George Bernard Shaw
The Cherry Orchard – by Anton Chekhov
An Ideal Husband – by Oscar Wilde
John Bull's Other Island – by George Bernard Shaw
Age of Arousal – by Linda Griffiths
Harvey – by Mary Coyle Chase
One Touch of Venus – by Kurt Weill, book by S. J. Perelman and Ogden Nash, lyrics by Ogden Nash
Half an Hour – by J. M. Barrie
Serious Money - by Caryl Churchill

2011
Heartbreak House – by George Bernard Shaw
On the Rocks – by George Bernard Shaw
Candida – by George Bernard Shaw
My Fair Lady – book and lyrics by Alan Jay Lerner, music by Frederick Loewe
Maria Severa – book, music & lyrics by Jay Turvey and Paul Sportelli
The Admirable Crichton – by J.M. Barrie
Drama at Inish – A Comedy – by Lennox Robinson
Cat on a Hot Tin Roof – by Tennessee Williams
The President – by Ferenc Molnár
Topdog/Underdog – by Suzan-Lori Parks
When the Rain Stops Falling – by Andrew Bovell

2012
The Millionairess – by George Bernard Shaw
Misalliance – by George Bernard Shaw
A Man and Some Women – by Githa Sowerby
Ragtime – book by Terrence McNally, music by Stephen Flaherty, based on the novel by E.L. Doctorow
Present Laughter – by Noël Coward
Trouble in Tahiti – Music & libretto by Leonard Bernstein
Hedda Gabler – by Henrik Ibsen
French Without Tears – by Terence Rattigan
Come Back, Little Sheba – by William Inge
Helen’s Necklace – by Carole Fréchette in an English version by John Murrell (playwright)

2013
Guys and Dolls – music and lyrics by Frank Loesser, book by Jo Swerling and Abe Burrows
Lady Windermere's Fan – by Oscar Wilde
Enchanted April – by Elizabeth von Arnim, adapted by Matthew Barber
Peace In Our Time: A Comedy – by John Murrell, adapted from Geneva by George Bernard Shaw
The Light in the Piazza – book by Craig Lucas, music and lyrics by Adam Guettel
Trifles – by Susan Glaspell
Our Betters – by W. Somerset Maugham
Major Barbara – by George Bernard Shaw
Faith Healer – by Brian Friel
Arcadia – by Tom Stoppard

2014
Cabaret – book by Joe Masteroff, lyrics by Fred Ebb, music by John Kander
The Philadelphia Story — by Philip Barry
The Philanderer — by George Bernard Shaw
The Charity That Began at Home — by St. John Hankin
The Sea — by Edward Bond
Arms and the Man — by George Bernard Shaw
When We Are Married –  by J.B. Priestley
Juno and the Paycock — by Seán O'Casey
The Mountaintop — by Katori Hall
A Lovely Sunday for Creve Coeur — by Tennessee Williams

2015
Sweet Charity – book by Neil Simon, music by Cy Coleman, lyrics by Dorothy Fields
Pygmalion – by George Bernard Shaw
Light Up the Sky – by Moss Hart
The Lady from the Sea – by Henrik Ibsen, adapted by Erin Shields
Top Girls – by Caryl Churchill
The Twelve-Pound Look – By J. M. Barrie
Peter and the Starcatcher – by Dave Barry and Ridley Pearson, adapted by Rick Elice
You Never Can Tell – by George Bernard Shaw
The Divine: A Play for Sarah Bernhardt – by Michel Marc Bouchard, translated by Linda Gaboriau
The Intelligent Homosexual's Guide to Capitalism and Socialism with a Key to the Scriptures – by Tony Kushner

2016
Alice in Wonderland – by Lewis Carroll, adapted by Peter Hinton, music by Allen Cole
A Woman of No Importance – by Oscar Wilde
Sweeney Todd: The Demon Barber of Fleet Street – music and lyrics by Stephen Sondheim, book by Hugh Wheeler
Uncle Vanya – by Anton Chekhov
Mrs. Warren's Profession – by George Bernard Shaw
"Master Harold"...and the Boys – by Athol Fugard
Our Town – by Thornton Wilder
Engaged – by W.S. Gilbert
The Adventures of the Black Girl in Her Search for God – by George Bernard Shaw, adapted by Lisa Codrington
The Dance of Death – by August Strindberg, adapted by Richard Greenberg

2017
Me and My Girl - book and lyrics by Douglas Furber and L. Arthur Rose, music by Noel Gay
Saint Joan – by George Bernard Shaw
Dracula - by Bram Stoker, adapted by Liz Lochhead
1837: The Farmers’ Revolt - by Rick Salutin
Androcles and the Lion – by George Bernard Shaw
Wilde Tales - by Oscar Wilde
The Madness of George III - by Alan Bennett
Dancing at Lughnasa - by Brian Friel
An Octoroon - by Branden Jacobs-Jenkins
Middletown - by Will Eno
1979 - by Michael Healey

2018
The Magician's Nephew - by C.S. Lewis, adapted for the stage by Michael O'Brien
Grand Hotel - book by Luther Davis, music and lyrics by Robert Wright and George Forrest, with additional music by Maury Yeston
Mythos: A Trilogy. Gods. Heroes. Men. - by Stephen Fry
The Hound of the Baskervilles - by Sir Arthur Conan Doyle, adapted by R. Hamilton Wright and David Pichette
Stage Kiss - by Sarah Ruhl
Of Marriage and Men: A Comedy Double-Bill (How He Lied to Her Husband and The Man of Destiny) - by George Bernard Shaw
O'Flaherty V.C. - by George Bernard Shaw
Oh What a Lovely War - by Joan Littlewood, Theatre Workshop and Charles Chilton
A Christmas Carol - by Charles Dickens
The Orchard (After Chekhov) - by Serena Parmar
The Baroness and the Pig - by Michael Mackenzie
Henry V - by William Shakespeare

2019
The Horse and His Boy - by C.S. Lewis, adapted for the stage by Anna Chatterton
Brigadoon - book and lyrics by Jay Lerner, music by Frederick Loewe
The Ladykillers - by Graham Linehan, from the motion picture screenplay by William Rose
Man and Superman with Don Juan in Hell - by Bernard Shaw
Mahabharata: Beginnings - by Ravi Jain
Rope - by Patrick Hamilton
Getting Married - by Bernard Shaw
The Russian Play - by Hannah Moscovitch
Cyrano de Bergerac - by Edmond Rostand, translated and adapted for the stage by Kate Hennig
The Glass Menagerie - by Tennessee Williams
Sex - by Mae West
Victory - by Howard Barker
A Christmas Carol - by Charles Dickens
Holiday Inn - music and lyrics by Irving Berlin, book by Gordon Greenberg and Chad Hodge

2020

Due to the COVID-19 pandemic, it was announced on August 26, 2020, that the entirety of the 2020 season was cancelled, with the possible exception of A Christmas Carol, which may still be performed depending on government guidelines. Previously, on July 22, 2020, it was said there was the possibility that some performances of Charley's Aunt and Flush might begin in September.

Gypsy - book by Arthur Laurents, music by Jule Styne, lyrics by Stephen Sondheim
The Devil's Disciple - by Bernard Shaw
Sherlock Holmes and the Raven’s Curse - by R. Hamilton Wright, based on the works of Sir Arthur Conan Doyle
Mahabharata - adapted by Ravi Jain and Miriam Fernandes, original concept developed with Jenny Koons
Charley's Aunt - by Brandon Thomas
Prince Caspian - adapted for the stage by Damien Atkins, based on the novel by C.S. Lewis
Flush - based on the novella by Virginia Woolf, adapted and directed by Tim Carroll
Assassins - book by John Weidman, music and Lyrics by Stephen Sondheim, from an idea by Charles Gilbert, Jr.
The Playboy of the Western World - by J.M. Synge
Desire Under the Elms by Eugene O'Neill
Trouble in Mind - by Alice Childress
The History of Niagara - created and performed by Mike Petersen and Alexandra Montagnese, at Fort George Historic Site, in association with Parks Canada
A Christmas Carol - by Charles Dickens
Me and My Girl - book and lyrics by L. Arthur Rose and Douglas Furber, book revised by Stephen Fry, with contributions by Mike Ockrent, music by Noel Gay. Presented for the Christmas season.

2021
For the 2021 season, the Shaw Festival presented many of the productions that were originally scheduled for 2020.

The Devil's Disciple - by Bernard Shaw
Sherlock Holmes and the Raven’s Curse - by R. Hamilton Wright, based on the works of Sir Arthur Conan Doyle
Charley's Aunt - by Brandon Thomas
Flush - based on the novella by Virginia Woolf, adapted and directed by Tim Carroll
Desire Under the Elms by Eugene O'Neill
Trouble in Mind - by Alice Childress
The History of Niagara - created and performed by Mike Petersen and Alexandra Montagnese, at Fort George Historic Site, in association with Parks Canada
A Christmas Carol - by Charles Dickens
Holiday Inn - music and lyrics by Irving Berlin, book by Gordon Greenberg and Chad Hodge

Gypsy, originally planned for the 2020 season, and then intended to be staged in 2021, has now been postponed until the 2023 season.

The productions that were originally scheduled, and subsequently cancelled, for 2020 and not planned for 2021 are: Mahabharata, Prince Caspian, Assassins, The Playboy of the Western World, and Me and My Girl.

2022
Damn Yankees - book by George Abbott and Douglass Wallop, music and lyrics by Richard Adler and Jerry Ross
The Importance of Being Earnest – by Oscar Wilde
The Doctor's Dilemma – by George Bernard Shaw
Cyrano de Bergerac - by Edmond Rostand, translated and adapted for the stage by Kate Hennig
Gaslight - by Johnna Wright and Patty Jamieson
Chitra - by Rabindranath Tagore
Just To Get Married - by Cicely Hamilton
This Is How We Got Here - by Keith Barker
Too True to be Good – by George Bernard Shaw
Everybody - by Branden Jacobs-Jenkins
Gem of the Ocean - by August Wilson
A Short History of Niagara - by Alexandra Montagnese and Mike Petersen
Fairground and Shawground
A Christmas Carol - by Charles Dickens
White Christmas - music and lyrics by Irving Berlin, book by David Ives and Paul Blake

2023
Mahabharata - written and adapted by Ravi Jain and Miriam Fernandes
Gypsy - book by Arthur Laurents, music by Jule Styne, lyrics by Stephen Sondheim
Blithe Spirit - by Noël Coward
The Amen Corner - by James Baldwin
Prince Caspian - adapted for the stage by Damien Atkins, based on the novel by C.S. Lewis
On the Razzle - by Tom Stoppard
Village Wooing - by Bernard Shaw
The Shadow of a Doubt - by Edith Wharton
The Playboy of the Western World - by J.M. Synge
The Apple Cart - by Bernard Shaw
The Clearing - by Helen Edmundson
The Game of Love and Chance - by Pierre de MarivauxMother, Daughter - by Selma DimitrijevicA Short History of Niagara - by Alexandra Montagnese and Mike PetersenBrigadoon - book and lyrics by Alan Jay Lerner, music by Frederick LoeweA Christmas Carol - by Charles Dickens

Frequency of production of Shaw's playsThe Admirable Bashville - 1974Androcles and the Lion - 1963, 1984, 2017Annajanska, the Bolshevik Empress - 1994The Apple Cart - 1966, 1976, 2000, 2023Arms and the Man - 1967, 1976, 1986, 1994, 2006, 2014Augustus Does His Bit - 1987Back to Methuselah - 1969, 1986Caesar and Cleopatra - 1975, 1983, 2002Candida - 1962, 1970, 1983, 1993, 2002, 2011Captain Brassbound's Conversion - 1979The Dark Lady of the Sonnets - 1964, 1988The Devil's Disciple - 1974, 1984, 1996, 2009, 2021The Doctor's Dilemma - 1969, 1991, 2000, 2010, 2022The Fascinating Foundling - 1984Fanny's First Play - 1973, 1987, 2001Geneva - 1988Getting Married - 1972, 1989, 1999, 2008, 2019The Glimpse of Reality - 1989Great Catherine - 1977Heartbreak House - 1964, 1968, 1978, 1985, 1999, 2011How He Lied to Her Husband - 1963, 1984, 2018The Inca of Perusalem - 1985In Good King Charles's Golden Days - 1981, 1997, 2009John Bull's Other Island - 1964, 1985, 1998, 2010Major Barbara - 1967, 1978, 1987, 1998, 2005, 2013The Man of Destiny - 1963, 1981, 1993, 2018Man and Superman - 1962, 1966, 1977, 1989, 2004, 2019The Millionairess - 1965, 1977, 1991, 2001, 2012Misalliance - 1966, 1972, 1980, 1990, 2003, 2012Mrs. Warren's Profession - 1976, 1990, 1997, 2008, 2016The Music Cure - 1982O'Flaherty V.C.  - 1971, 1983, 2018On the Rocks - 1986, 2011Overruled - 1980, 1992Passion, Poison and Petrifaction - 1986, 1998The Philanderer - 1971, 1980, 1995, 2007, 2014Press Cuttings - 1971, 1991Pygmalion - 1965, 1975, 1982, 1992, 2004, 2015Saint Joan - 1981, 1993, 2007, 2017Shakes versus Shav - 1989The Simpleton of the Unexpected Isles - 1983, 1996The Six of Calais - 1995Too True to be Good - 1974, 1982, 1994, 2006You Never Can Tell - 1963, 1973, 1979, 1988, 1995, 2005, 2015Village Wooing - 1964, 1979, 1990, 1999, 2023Widower's Houses - 1977, 1992, 2003

Note: The following original theatrical works by Shaw have never been produced at the Shaw Festival:Buoyant Billions, Cymbeline Refinished, Farfetched Fables, The Shewing-Up of Blanco Posnet, and Why She Would Not''.

References

Bibliography

External links
Shaw Festival Online

Canadian theatre company production histories
Theatre festivals in Ontario
George Bernard Shaw